A list of films produced in Brazil in 1943:

See also
 1943 in Brazil

External links
Brazilian films of 1943 at the Internet Movie Database

Brazil
1943
Films